"Marry Me" is a song by American singer Jennifer Lopez and Colombian singer Maluma. It was released through Universal Studios and Sony Music Latin on February 2, 2022, as the third single from the soundtrack to the 2022 romantic comedy film of the same name. Two versions of the song were recorded: a ballad version and an uptempo version denoted as "Kat & Bastian Duet".

The ballad version was written by Michael Pollack, Nicholas Sarazen, Olivia Waithe, Maluma and Edgar Barrera and produced by Kim Burse and Kevin Teasley. The uptempo version was produced by Pollack, The Monsters & Strangerz and Sarazen and features additional writing from Stefan Johnson, Jordan Johnson and Oliver Peterhof.

Music video

Kat & Bastian Duet 
The music video for the "Kat & Bastian Duet" version of "Marry Me", premiered exclusively on Facebook on March 18, 2021, and later on YouTube on June 18, 2022.

Ballad
The music video for the ballad version of "Marry Me" was released on March 11, 2022. In the video, Ben Affleck makes a cameo appearance.

The bed sequence of the music video has a link to an earlier Lopez music video, Baby I Love U! (a Ben Affleck inspired song), as both music videos have a bed sequence. In 'Baby I love U' she is alone in bed and looking at the camera, but in the music video for Marry Me (Ballad) she is seen in bed alongside Ben Affleck.

Critical reception
Tomás Mier of Rolling Stone called the "Kat & Bastian Duet" version of "Marry Me" an "earnworm" and said that while the lyrics are repetitive, Lopez's "sugary vocals" and its "cinematic production" make up for it. He, however, stated that the ballad version "falls flat".

Charts

Weekly charts

Year-end charts

Release history

References

External links

2022 singles
2022 songs
2020s ballads
Jennifer Lopez songs
Male–female vocal duets
Maluma songs
Songs written for films
Sony Music Latin singles
Songs written by Michael Pollack (musician)
Songs written by Livvi Franc
Songs written by Stefan Johnson
Songs written by Maluma (singer)
Songs written by Edgar Barrera
Songs written by Jordan Johnson (songwriter)